The discography of the British band The Jam consists of 6 studio albums, 5 live albums, 13 compilation albums, 6 videos, 3 extended plays, 18 singles, and 3 B-sides. The band, who formed in 1972, didn't debut until five years later in 1977, when they released their debut studio album In the City, which entered at #20 place in the UK Albums Chart, and contained the title-track, "In the City". Their second album, This Is the Modern World, was the first to get into the Billboard 200 (US Albums Chart), taking its place at #201 while at #22 in the UK Albums Chart. Their most successful studio album was their final album The Gift in 1982 which took its place at #1 in the UK and at #82 in the US.

The Jam were seen as the centre of mod revival culture during the 1970s to the 1980s, and the lead singer of the band, Paul Weller, was seen as The Modfather. The band separated in 1982, following ten years active, and five years of success. Shortly after the band's break-up, Weller went on to form The Style Council, before embarking on a solo career and releasing his first studio album, which was self-titled, in 1992.

Albums

Studio albums

Live albums

Compilation albums

Extended plays

Singles

Videography 
Transglobal Unity Express (1982)
Snap! (1983)
Greatest Hits (1991)
The Very Best of the Jam (1997)
The Complete Jam On Film 1977–1982 (2002)
The Complete Jam (2002/2003)
Punk Icons (2006)
About The Young Idea (2015)

Notes

References 

Discography
Discographies of British artists
Punk rock discographies